Michael Andrew Atherton  (born 23 March 1968) is a broadcaster, journalist and a former England international first-class cricketer. A right-handed opening batsman for Lancashire and England, and occasional leg-break bowler, he achieved the captaincy of England at the age of 25 and led the side in a record 54 Test matches. Known for his stubborn resistance during an era of hostile fast bowling, Atherton was described in 2001 as a determined defensive opener who made "batting look like trench warfare". He had several famed bouts with bowlers including South Africa's Allan Donald and Australia's Glenn McGrath. Atherton often played the anchor role at a time when England batting performances lacked consistency.

His playing career included controversy, including ball tampering, and several brushes with the media with whom, by Atherton's own admission, he did not have a good understanding when he was a player. Often hampered by a chronic back complaint which was to contribute to the end of his career, Atherton was considered a leading England batsman during the 1990s. Following retirement he became a journalist and is a cricket commentator with Sky Sports, and chief cricket correspondent of The Times.

Early career
Atherton was born in Failsworth, Lancashire, England. His family includes several known sportspeople, such as his father Alan, a former Manchester United reserve central defender in the 1960s.

As a youth, he captained the Manchester Grammar School cricket team, for whom he scored almost 3,500 runs and took 170 wickets. His performances led to selection for the England under-19 team, which he captained aged 16. He also represented Lancashire Schools from 1982 to 1986. In 1983 he won the Jack Hobbs Memorial Award as the Outstanding Schoolboy Cricketer at under-15 level. In a (non-first-class) match against the Marylebone Cricket Club in 1984 he took 6–27.

Entering Downing College, Cambridge, to read History, he was selected at 18 to play for Cambridge University Cricket Club and awarded a blue. A year later he made 73 on his county debut for Lancashire, scoring his maiden first-class hundred against Derbyshire a fortnight later. During this time he represented his university, the Combined Universities cricket team (which he captained to the quarter finals of the Benson & Hedges Cup in 1989) and his county. This early rise through the ranks, and extensive leadership experience earned him the nickname "FEC", which is thought to have stood for "future England captain". In his autobiography Opening Up, Atherton is candid about the fact that there are more colourful alternatives for "FEC"; the second word being "educated"; as suggested by his teammates at the time.

International career
Atherton's heady rise continued when he made his debut for England in the fifth test of 1989 against Australia at Trent Bridge, where he scored 0 and 47. Atherton's chance came when several England players announced their decision to go on a rebel tour to South Africa and so were banned from the Test team. Despite these defections, he was selected as vice-captain of the 1989–90 A-team tour to Zimbabwe rather than for the West Indies tour. He learned that he would make his debut when captain David Gower threw a plastic bag of England caps and sweaters at him.

Atherton returned to the England side in the summer of 1990, partnering Graham Gooch at the top of the order and giving the first demonstration of his abilities at international level. In his first innings after recall, and his first opening the batting for England, he scored 151 against New Zealand. He shared an opening partnership of 204 with Gooch against India at Lord's, in the match famous for Gooch's scores of 333 and 123, as well as further big opening partnerships in the next two Tests, and Test centuries against New Zealand and India earned him the title of Young Cricketer of the Year.

During the winter of 1990–91, Atherton faced a sterner test on the Ashes tour of Australia. Although he made a century in the third Test at Sydney, which would prove to be his only century in an Ashes Test, he averaged just 31 for his 279 runs, and England lost 3–0. Atherton struggled against the West Indies in 1991 and missed the 1992 Cricket World Cup and tour of New Zealand with fitness problems, but was recalled to the Test team in the summer of 1992.

When Australia arrived for the 1993 Ashes series, Atherton's place in the team was not assured. However, a consistent summer, during which he scored six 50s in six Tests (including 99 at Lord's), cemented his place in the side at a fortunate time. Graham Gooch, frustrated by continual losses against Australia, resigned as captain after the fourth Test and Atherton, aged just 25, replaced him. He lost his first match in charge but England managed to beat Australia in a morale-boosting final Test; England had not beaten Australia in the previous 18 Test matches.

Atherton's first tour as captain, to the West Indies in the winter of 1993–94, was not a success as England lost 3–1. This was a series of highs and lows: Brian Lara of the West Indies compiled a world-record 375 against them at Antigua; England were bowled out for 46 to lose the third Test (and with it the series) but then roared back at Bridgetown to win the fourth Test thanks to two centuries from Alec Stewart. For his part, Atherton was the best of the English batsmen, scoring 510 runs at an average of 56.67.

Earning plaudits for his determination and leadership, Atherton followed up with two centuries in the three-match series at home against New Zealand. His reputation suffered a blow when he was implicated in a ball-tampering controversy during the first Test against South Africa at Lord's, for which he was fined £2,000 by Ray Illingworth. Atherton was accused of lying to Peter Burge, the match referee. Atherton claims in his autobiography that he answered 'no' when asked if he had anything in his pockets. He believed that Burge was referring to nefarious substances such as resin or lip salve. Nonetheless the TV pictures were damning, showing Atherton deliberately putting dirt, taken from the pitch, on the ball. Strictly speaking, Atherton was not breaking the laws – he pointed out that plenty of bowlers improve their grip on the ball by rubbing their hands on the pitch.

After this incident Atherton and England headed to Headingley for the second Test. Atherton played one of his best innings, grinding out 99 before being caught and bowled by Brian McMillan. Atherton stated that this innings was the best answer he could have given to the 'gutter press'. He led England to a win in the third Test at the Oval, which tied the series, although he failed to score a century.

After winning against South Africa, Atherton faced the supreme test of his leadership: an Ashes tour to Australia. His form stood well, with 407 runs at 40.7, but he was unable to convert any of his four half-centuries in the Test series into a hundred. Although England had a thrilling win at Adelaide, England's first Test victory in Australia for eight years, the team stumbled to a 1–3 loss. There was also controversy in the drawn Sydney test when England's Graeme Hick was approaching what would have been his only Ashes Test hundred. According to Wisden: "In what was thought to be the last-but-one over of the innings, Hick, on 98, blocked three successive balls, and Atherton lost patience and ungenerously declared; he had batted far more slowly himself".

The next two years followed a similar pattern. Although a draw in a Test series against the West Indies in 1995 and victory in Test series at home against India and away against New Zealand suggested that England were improving, the team continued to struggle against the talent of Australia and Pakistan. Although Atherton led England to victory in the first test of the 1997 Ashes at Birmingham, England's only victory in an Ashes Test that was not a dead rubber between 1986 and 2005, England lost the series 3-2. England also crashed out of the 1996 Cricket World Cup after defeat to eventual champions Sri Lanka, controversy also ensuing during this tournament after a defeat when Atherton's irritated observation about a local journalist was picked up on tape. The lack of consistent progress and the effect of a back ailment contributed to Atherton's decision to resign after five years as captain after a defeat in the West Indies in 1997-8.

Atherton continued to play Test cricket for a further four years before retiring at the end of the 2001 Ashes. However, plagued by his chronic back condition, he did not manage to attain his previous levels of performance. Highlights of his later career however included man of the match-winning Test centuries at the Oval and Karachi in 2000, in Tests which ensured England rare Test series victories respectively against the West Indies (their first for 31 years), and Pakistan (their first for 18 years).

Atherton's finest performances came when he had his back against the wall. Notable examples include his monumental 185 not out in 643 minutes to salvage a draw against South Africa, and his negation of an outstanding Allan Donald onslaught in 1998. This doggedness prompted Steve Waugh to dub him "The Cockroach", but his record against Australia was modest. He averaged under thirty, with only one century in 33 tests. and he was dismissed 19 times by Glenn McGrath, the Australian opening bowler, a record for any bowler against one batsman.

Alongside McGrath two other world-class bowlers frequently tormented Atherton, with Courtney Walsh dismissing him 17 times and Shane Warne 10 times. As well as being seen as struggling against the very best, Atherton has the dubious honour of having the lowest batting average of any player to have scored 6,000 or more runs in Test cricket. He was also dismissed for nought on 20 occasions at Test level, which was an English record at the time of his retirement.

International centuries
During his career Atherton made 18 centuries in international cricket, 16 of which were scored in Tests while the other two came in One Day Internationals. In Tests, 13 of his centuries came in the first innings and 3 in the second innings. In ODIs, one century came in the first innings and the other whilst chasing.

Key
 *  Remained not out
   Man of the match
   Captain of England in that match

Test cricket centuries

ODI Centuries

Post-playing career

Since his retirement from the game, Atherton has carved out a successful career in the media. He was a journalist for The Sunday Telegraph and succeeded Christopher Martin-Jenkins as The Times cricket correspondent on 1 May 2008.

Between 2002 and 2005, he was a member of the Channel 4 commentary team for the coverage of Test cricket in England. During this period he also worked as a commentator for BBC Radio and Talksport on Test matches outside England. Atherton joined the Sky Sports commentary team in 2005, after they won the rights to live Test cricket in England, joining long-time England teammate Nasser Hussain, their former England coach David "Bumble" Lloyd and former England captain David Gower. He commentates on all forms of the game, home and abroad, as well as covering some domestic matches. He often performs as the post-match master of ceremonies for internationals in England, presenting awards and interviewing players.

In 2002 he produced his autobiography: Opening Up. He has also written Gambling: A Story of Triumph and Disaster, published in 2006.

In March 2010 he won Sports Journalist of the Year, at the British Press Awards. The judges announced this was "a unanimous choice", praised the former England cricket captain for "tackling subjects way beyond cricket" and said "the brilliance of his writing shines."

He was one of the commentators in 2011 Cricket World Cup. He has gained fame for his no nonsense but dryly humorous views on cricket.

Personal life
Atherton is married to Isabelle De Caires (granddaughter of West Indies test cricketer Frank De Caires), hailing from Guyana. Atherton's elder son, Joshua de Caires, signed a professional contract with Middlesex in 2020 after playing for the county's academy since Under 15 level. He made his first-class debut for Middlesex versus Gloucestershire at Cheltenham on 5 July 2021.

Health
Atherton suffers from the degenerative condition ankylosing spondylitis, which meant he could not duck under bouncers, but had to stand tall and sway out of the way. Allan Donald used this against him by bowling short.

References
Notes

Written sources

External links

 
 Atherton's personal website

1968 births
Living people
People from Failsworth
People educated at Manchester Grammar School
Alumni of Downing College, Cambridge
Cambridge University cricketers
Lancashire cricketers
England Test cricket captains
English cricketers
English cricketers of 1969 to 2000
England One Day International cricketers
England Test cricketers
Cricketers at the 1996 Cricket World Cup
English cricket commentators
British male journalists
British sportswriters
Cricket historians and writers
The Times people
The Daily Telegraph people
Officers of the Order of the British Empire
Wisden Cricketers of the Year
Marylebone Cricket Club cricketers
People with ankylosing spondylitis
British Universities cricketers
Oxford and Cambridge Universities cricketers